Chocholá Municipality is one of 106 municipalities in the Mexican state of Yucatán.  It is located in the western part of the state, about 21 kilometers southwest of the city of Mérida.  The name is said to mean "brackish water".

Chocholá, pronounced "choh choh LAH" is home to much advertised cenote as well as a luxury hotel, the Hacienda Chablé. At the time of this writing (Spring 2020) the town's center has been refurbished and painted in pretty colors, making it a good stop for photography buffs.

 Area: 99. 64 km2.  
 Population: 4,339
  Women: 2,135
  Men: 2,205
 Average elevation: 14 meters

Geography
The municipality is bordered on the south by Kopomá, and on the west by Samahil and Maxcanú.  To the north and east lies Umán and Samahil also shares a part of the northern boundary.

Water and land
The terrain is flat and rocky. Primary use is for grazing, agriculture and forestry.  Water sources are underground and include six cenotes.  The climate is sub-humid with rain falling primarily between the months of May and July.  The average rainfall is 1200 mm.  The average annual temperature is 26.8 °C.

Communities
The primary population centre is the eponymous Chocholá. Among the other communities of the municipality are Pujil, Chablé, San Francisco, Juat, San Matías, Cheneld, and San Pablo.

Points of interest
 The former Chocholá hacienda
 Temple of the Immaculate Conception
 Maya sites
 Cenote San Ignacio, small with restaurant, bathrooms and generally set up for tourism
 Chocholá is home to the Hacienda Chablé, a luxury hotel

Events and festivities
 Mexican Independence Day: Sept. 16
 Day of the Mexican Revolution: Nov. 20
 Easter: Thursday and Friday before
 Holy Cross Day, May 3
 Virgin of Guadalupe celebration: Dec. 12
 Day of the Dead: Nov. 2
 Celebration in honor of Christ's Love: Sept. 24-30

Government
Elections are held every three years, when the mayor and his cabinet are chosen.  There are fifteen localities in the municipality; the most important are: Chocholá (cabecera municipal), San Antonio Chablé, El Roble, Tch'een-Men, El Limonar, Doroteo Arango, Misko, San Luis Dos, Santa María, Xamán Ek and San Luis Cuatro.

References

External links

 Chocholá, Yucatán in the Enciclopedia de los Municipios y Delegaciones de México.
 Prontuario de Información Geográfica Municipal - Geographical information on the municipality published by INEGI. (in Spanish)

Municipalities of Yucatán